Paku Alam III was Duke (Adipati) of Pakualaman between 1858 and 1864, making it the second shortest reigning Paku Alam.

Pakualaman became a small hereditary Duchy within the Sultanate of Yogyakarta, as a mirror-image of Mangkunegaran in the territory of the Susuhunanate of Surakarta.

Paku Alam III was considered to be an enthusiastic author and literary patron.

The son of Paku Alam II, Paku Alam III was buried at Kota Gede.

Subsequent list of rulers
 Paku Alam IV, 1864 – 1878
 Paku Alam V, 1878 – 1900
 Paku Alam VI, 1901 – 1902
 Paku Alam VII, 1903 – 1938
 Paku Alam VIII, 1938 – 1999
 Paku Alam IX, 1999 – 2015
 Paku Alam X, 2015 – present

Notes

1864 deaths
Dukes of Pakualaman
Pakualaman
Burials at Kotagede
Indonesian royalty